The Last of England is a 1987 British arthouse film directed by Derek Jarman and starring Tilda Swinton.

It is a poetic depiction of what Jarman felt was the loss of traditional English culture in the 1980s and his anger about Thatcher's England (including the formation of Section 28 Local Government Act),
It is named after The Last of England, a painting by Ford Madox Brown.

One of the film's most famous scenes is of Tilda Swinton as a bride mourning her executed husband.  The scene was shot near the director's home on the beach of Dungeness, Kent.

Jarman wrote a book to accompany the film.

Cast
 Tilda Swinton as The Maid
 Spencer Leigh as Soldier / Various roles
 'Spring' Mark Adley as Spring / Various roles 
 Gerrard McArthur as Various roles
 Jonny Phillips (credited as Jonathan Phillips) as Various roles 
 Gay Gaynor as Various roles
 Matthew Hawkins as Junkyard Guy
 Nigel Terry as Narrator (voice)

Awards
Derek Jarman received the 1988 Teddy Award in Berlin for the film. Also Tilda Swinton received the jury prize for her performance in the film.

Reviews
On Rotten Tomatoes, it has an average score of 68%, based on 3 reviews.

'What proof do you need the world's curling up like an autumn leaf?' wrote Time Out magazine.

David Bezanson wrote that the film is “graphic and disorienting, yet also totally trite".

Soundtrack album

Two versions of the soundtrack album were released on the Mute Records label. The LP has one side ("Bombers") by Simon Turner, and the other ("Diplomat") by a variety of performers, including Mayo Thompson with Albert Oehlen and Tilda Swinton; Andy Gill with Dean Garcia, Barry Adamson and Martin Micarrick, Brian Gulland and Diamanda Galas. The CD version includes all of this material and a third section, "Dead to the World", primarily by Turner.

References

External links
 
 

1988 films
1987 LGBT-related films
1987 films
Films set in London
1980s English-language films
Films directed by Derek Jarman
English films
Non-narrative films
1980s avant-garde and experimental films
British avant-garde and experimental films
1980s British films